A permutable prime, also known as anagrammatic prime, is a prime number which, in a given base, can have its digits' positions switched through any permutation and still be a prime number. H. E. Richert, who is supposedly the first to study these primes, called them permutable primes, but later they were also called absolute primes.

Base 2 
In base 2, only repunits can be permutable primes, because any 0 permuted to the ones place results in an even number. Therefore, the base 2 permutable primes are the Mersenne primes. The generalization can safely be made that for any positional number system, permutable primes with more than one digit can only have digits that are coprime with the radix of the number system. One-digit primes, meaning any prime below the radix, are always trivially permutable.

Base 10 
In base 10, all the permutable primes with fewer than 49,081 digits are known
2, 3, 5, 7, 11, 13, 17, 31, 37, 71, 73, 79, 97, 113, 131, 199, 311, 337, 373, 733, 919, 991, R19 (1111111111111111111), R23, R317, R1031, R49081, ... 

Of the above, there are 16 unique permutation sets, with smallest elements
2, 3, 5, 7, R2, 13, 17, 37, 79, 113, 199, 337, R19, R23, R317, R1031, ... 

Note Rn :=  is a repunit, a number consisting only of n ones (in base 10). Any repunit prime is a permutable prime with the above definition, but some definitions require at least two distinct digits.

All permutable primes of two or more digits are composed from the digits 1, 3, 7, 9, because no prime number except 2 is even, and no prime number besides 5 is divisible by 5.  It is proven that no permutable prime exists which contains three different of the four digits 1, 3, 7, 9, as well as that there exists no permutable prime composed of two or more of each of two digits selected from 1, 3, 7, 9.

There is no n-digit permutable prime for 3 < n < 6·10175 which is not a repunit. It is conjectured that there are no non-repunit permutable primes other than the eighteen listed above. They can be split into seven permutation sets:
{13, 31}, {17, 71}, {37, 73}, {79, 97}, {113, 131, 311}, {199, 919, 991}, {337, 373, 733}.

Base 12 
In base 12, the smallest elements of the unique permutation sets of the permutable primes with fewer than 9,739 digits are known (using inverted two and three for ten and eleven, respectively)
2, 3, 5, 7, Ɛ, R2, 15, 57, 5Ɛ, R3, 117, 11Ɛ, 555Ɛ, R5, R17, R81, R91, R225, R255, R4ᘔ5, ...

There is no n-digit permutable prime in base 12 for 4 < n < 12144 which is not a repunit. It is conjectured that there are no non-repunit permutable primes in base 12 other than those listed above.

In base 10 and base 12, every permutable prime is a repunit or a near-repdigit, that is, it is a permutation of the integer 
P(b, n, x, y) = xxxx...xxxyb (n digits, in base b)
where x and y are digits which is coprime to b. Besides, x and y must be also coprime (since if there is a prime p divides both x and y, then p also divides the number), so if x = y, then x = y = 1. (This is not true in all bases, but exceptions are rare and could be finite in any given base; the only exceptions below 109 in bases up to 20 are: 13911, 36A11, 24713, 78A13, 29E19 (M. Fiorentini, 2015).)

Arbitrary bases 
Let P(b, n, x, y) be a permutable prime in base b and let p be a prime such that n ≥ p. If b is a primitive root of p, and p does not divide x or |x - y|, then n is a multiple of p - 1. (Since b is a primitive root mod p and p does not divide |x − y|, the p numbers xxxx...xxxy, xxxx...xxyx, xxxx...xyxx, ..., xxxx...xyxx...xxxx (only the bp−2 digit is y, others are all x), xxxx...yxxx...xxxx (only the bp−1 digit is y, others are all x), xxxx...xxxx (the repdigit with n xs) mod p are all different. That is, one is 0, another is 1, another is 2, ..., the other is p − 1. Thus, since the first p − 1 numbers are all primes, the last number (the repdigit with n xs) must be divisible by p. Since p does not divide x, so p must divide the repunit with n 1s. Since b is a primitive root mod p, the multiplicative order of n mod p is p − 1. Thus, n must be divisible by p − 1.)

Thus, if b = 10, the digits coprime to 10 are {1, 3, 7, 9}. Since 10 is a primitive root mod 7, so if n ≥ 7, then either 7 divides x (in this case, x = 7, since x ∈ {1, 3, 7, 9}) or |x − y| (in this case, x = y = 1, since x, y ∈ {1, 3, 7, 9}. That is, the prime is a repunit) or n is a multiple of 7 − 1 = 6. Similarly, since 10 is a primitive root mod 17, so if n ≥ 17, then either 17 divides x (not possible, since x ∈ {1, 3, 7, 9}) or |x − y| (in this case, x = y = 1, since x, y ∈ {1, 3, 7, 9}. That is, the prime is a repunit) or n is a multiple of 17 − 1 = 16. Besides, 10 is also a primitive root mod 19, 23, 29, 47, 59, 61, 97, 109, 113, 131, 149, 167, 179, 181, 193, ..., so n ≥ 17 is very impossible (since for this primes p, if n ≥ p, then n is divisible by p − 1), and if 7 ≤ n < 17, then x = 7, or n is divisible by 6 (the only possible n is 12). If b = 12, the digits coprime to 12 are {1, 5, 7, 11}. Since 12 is a primitive root mod 5, so if n ≥ 5, then either 5 divides x (in this case, x = 5, since x ∈ {1, 5, 7, 11}) or |x − y| (in this case, either x = y = 1 (That is, the prime is a repunit) or x = 1, y = 11 or x = 11, y = 1, since x, y ∈ {1, 5, 7, 11}.) or n is a multiple of 5 − 1 = 4. Similarly, since 12 is a primitive root mod 7, so if n ≥ 7, then either 7 divides x (in this case, x = 7, since x ∈ {1, 5, 7, 11}) or |x − y| (in this case, x = y = 1, since x, y ∈ {1, 5, 7, 11}. That is, the prime is a repunit) or n is a multiple of 7 − 1 = 6. Similarly, since 12 is a primitive root mod 17, so if n ≥ 17, then either 17 divides x (not possible, since x ∈ {1, 5, 7, 11}) or |x − y| (in this case, x = y = 1, since x, y ∈ {1, 5, 7, 11}. That is, the prime is a repunit) or n is a multiple of 17 − 1 = 16. Besides, 12 is also a primitive root mod 31, 41, 43, 53, 67, 101, 103, 113, 127, 137, 139, 149, 151, 163, 173, 197, ..., so n ≥ 17 is very impossible (since for this primes p, if n ≥ p, then n is divisible by p − 1), and if 7 ≤ n < 17, then x = 7 (in this case, since 5 does not divide x or x − y, so n must be divisible by 4) or n is divisible by 6 (the only possible n is 12).

References 

Base-dependent integer sequences
Classes of prime numbers
Permutations